{{Speciesbox
| image = PapiloPelodoruspage.jpg
| image_caption = Illustration in Butler's original description in Proceedings of the Zoological Society of London
| taxon = Papilio pelodurus
| authority = Butler, 1896 
| synonyms =Papilio pelodurus pelodurus f.indiv. lyrus Le Cerf, 1924Papilio pelodurus pelodurus f.indiv. extensus Le Cerf, 1924Papilio pelodurus ab. histricus Boullet & Le Cerf, 1912Papilio pelodurus vesper f.indiv. excedens Le Cerf, 1924
}}Papilio pelodurus is a species of swallowtail butterfly from the genus Papilio that is found in Malawi, Tanzania and Zambia.

The larvae feed on Cryptocarya liebertiana and Ocotea usambarensis.

TaxonomyPapilio pelodurus is a member of the hesperus species-group. The members of the clade arePapilio hesperus Westwood, 1843Papilio euphranor Trimen, 1868Papilio horribilis Butler, 1874Papilio pelodurus Butler, 1896

SubspeciesPapilio pelodurus pelodurus (highland forest of Malawi)Papilio pelodurus vesper'' Le Cerf, 1924 (eastern and southern Tanzania, north-eastern Zambia, northern Malawi)

References

pelodorus
Butterflies described in 1896
Butterflies of Africa
Taxa named by Arthur Gardiner Butler